Hamad Khalid (Arabic:حمد خالد) (born 5 November 1994) is an Emirati footballer. He currently plays as a goalkeeper.

Career

Ahli
Hamad Khalid started his career at Al Ahli and is a product of the Al-Ahli's youth system.

Ajman
On 17 February 2016, left Al Ahli and signed with Ajman . On 12 January 2018, Hamad Khalid made his professional debut for Ajman against Al-Jazira in the Pro League.

External links

References

1994 births
Living people
Emirati footballers
Al Ahli Club (Dubai) players
Ajman Club players
UAE Pro League players
UAE First Division League players
Association football goalkeepers
Place of birth missing (living people)